Ge Lin Chu (born 1934) is a Chinese botanist.

Alternative names: Ge Ling Chu, Ge Lin(g) Zhu, Gelin Zhu

Taxon names authored
(List may be incomplete)
352 taxon names authored by Ge Lin Chu.

Publications
(List incomplete)
Kung, H.W., Chu, G.L., Tsien, C.P., Li, A.J., & Ma, C.G. 1978. The Chenopodiaceae in China.  Acta Phytotaxonomica Sinica  16(1): 99–123.
Kung, H.W., Chu, G.L., Tsien, C.P., Ma, C.G., & Li, A.J. 1979. Chenopodiaceae. In: Kung H.W. & Tsien, C.P. (eds.): Flora Reipublicae Popularis Sinicae 25(2): 1–194. 
Chu, G.L. 1987. Archiatriplex, a new chenopodiaceous genus from China. Journal of the Arnold Arboretum 68(4): 461–469. 
Stutz, H.C. & Sanderson, S.C., McArthur, E.D. & Chu,G.-L. 1987. Chromosome races of Grayia brandegei (Chenopodiaceae). Madroño 34(2): 142–149. 
 
Stutz, H.C. & Chu, G.L. 1993. Atriplex minuticarpa (Chenopodiaceae), a new species from eastern Utah. Madroño 40(3): 161–165, f. 1. 
Stutz, H.C. & Chu, G.L. 1993. Atriplex persistens (Chenopodiaceae), a new species from California. Madroño 40(4): 209–213. 
Stutz, H.C., Chu, G.L. & Sanderson, S.C. 1994. Atriplex asterocarpa (Chenopodiaceae), a new species from southern Utah and northern Arizona. Madroño 41(3): 199–204.
Stutz, H.C., Chu, G.L. & Sanderson, S.C. 1997. Atriplex erecticaulis (Chenopodiaceae): A new species from South-Central California. Madroño 44(1): 89–94, f. 1, 2 (right).
Stutz, H.C. & Chu, G.L. 1997. Atriplex subtilis (Chenopodiaceae): a new species from south-central California. Madroño 44(2): 184–188, figs. 1, 2a, 3.
Stutz, H.C. & Chu, G.L. 1997. Atriplex pachypoda (Chenopodiaceae), a new species from southwestern Colorado and northwestern New Mexico. Madroño 44(3): 277–281, f. 1, 2 (right).
Stutz, H.C., Chu, G.L. & Sanderson, S.C. 1998. Atriplex longitrichoma (Chenopodiaceae), a new species from southwestern Nevada and east-central California. Madroño 45(2): 128–130.
Chu, G.L. 2000. Chenopodiaceae. Higher Plants of China 4: 304–367. 
Zhu, G., Mosyakin, S.L. & Clemants, S.E. 2004. Chenopodiaceae. In: Flora of China 5. eFloras 2008.
Chu, G.L. & Sanderson, S.C. 2008. The genus Kochia (Chenopodiaceae) in North America. Madroño 55(4): 251–256.

 
Zhu, G.L. & Sanderson, S.C. 2017. Genera and a New Evolutionary System of World Chenopodiaceae. 361 pp. Beijing: Science Press.

References

20th-century Chinese botanists
Living people
1934 births
21st-century Chinese botanists